Ozell is both a given name and a surname. 

Notable people with the given name include:
Ozell Jones (1960–2006), American basketball player
Ozell Sutton (1925–2015), African-American Marine
Ozell Wells (born 1977), Dominican-American basketball coach

Notable people with the surname include:
John Ozell (d. 1743), British translator and accountant
Sunny Ozell (born 1978), American singer and songwriter